In information theory, Pinsker's inequality, named after its inventor Mark Semenovich Pinsker, is an inequality that bounds the total variation distance (or statistical distance) in terms of the Kullback–Leibler divergence.
The inequality is tight up to constant factors.

Formal statement

where

is the Kullback–Leibler divergence in nats.  When the sample space  is a finite set, the Kullback–Leibler divergence is given by

 

Note that in terms of the total variation norm  of the signed measure , Pinsker's inequality differs from the one given above by a factor of two:

A proof of Pinsker's inequality uses the partition inequality for f-divergences.

Alternative version 

Then,

Given the above comments, there is an alternative statement of Pinsker's inequality in some literature that relates information divergence to variation distance: 

i.e.,

in which 

This form of Pinsker's inequality shows that "convergence in divergence" is stronger notion than "convergence in variation distance".

A simple proof by John Pollard is shown by letting :

Here Titu's lemma is also known as Sedrakyan's inequality.

Note that the lower bound from Pinsker's inequality is vacuous for any distributions where , since the total variation distance is at most . For such distributions, an alternative bound can be used, due to Bretagnolle and Huber (see, also, Tsybakov):

History
Pinsker first proved the inequality with a greater constant. The inequality in the above form was proved independently by Kullback, Csiszár, and Kemperman.

Inverse problem
A precise inverse of the inequality cannot hold:  for every , there are distributions  with  but .

More specifically, it can be shown that with the definition  we have for any measure  which is absolutely continuous to 
 

As a consequence, if  has full support (i.e.  for all ), then

References

Further reading
 Thomas M. Cover and Joy A. Thomas: Elements of Information Theory, 2nd edition, Willey-Interscience, 2006
 Nicolo Cesa-Bianchi and Gábor Lugosi: Prediction, Learning, and Games, Cambridge University Press, 2006

Information theory
Probabilistic inequalities